William Gleeson was an Irish sportsperson in the 1880s.  Born in Cork he played hurling with the Tower St. club that won the senior county championship in 1888.  As a result of this Gleeson became the first man to captain a team representing Cork in the Munster Championship.  Unfortunately, the 1888 championship was never completed owing to a Gaelic Athletic Association tour to the United States.

Cork inter-county hurlers
Tower St hurlers
Year of death missing
Year of birth missing